Mogollon High School (MHS) is a public high school located in Heber, Arizona, United States. The school was established in 1989, and is the only high school under the jurisdiction of the Heber-Overgaard Unified School District. The school enrolls an estimated 135 students in grades 9–12, and operates on a traditional school calendar. Mogollon's colors are Red, Silver and Black and the teams are collectively called the Mustangs. The school is a member of the Arizona Interscholastic Association's 1A Central Athletics Conference and competes in Division Division IV sports. Mogollon junior high (grades 7-8) is located at the same site as the high school.

History
As the population of Heber and Overgaard grew, a local high school was planned. Prior to the school's construction, two buses shuttled students to and from Snowflake in order to attend high school classes. The school was established in 1989, with high school classes and sporting events held at Capps Elementary School until school buildings could be completed. Construction for Mogollon High School, by Spencer-Trulson, began on June 12, 1989. The site was formerly used for rodeo grounds and later a sawmill. The school was named after the nearby Mogollon Rim. The buildings were accepted by the governing board January 5, 1990. Funds were not immediately available to complete landscaping, purchase a stage, put in all of the gym bleachers or finish the office. A public dedication ceremony was held for the new school on January 18, 1990.

Controversy 
On October 21, 2019 the science teacher Melinda Porter was arrested after Navajo County Sheriff's Office said she had an inappropriate relationship with a student. Porter faces three counts of furnishing harmful items to a minor, one count of aggravated assault on a minor and one count of kidnapping.

Demographics
As of 2018, there were 15 total teachers, principals, and other school leaders and 125 students currently enrolled in the district with enrollment listed at 100%. Of the 15 teachers, principals, and other school leaders, 11 (73.33%) are listed as having greater than 3 years experience in the field and 3 of 15 are listed as having emergency credentials to teach out of the subject area in which they are certified.

The racial makeup of the students, in 2018, was 80% White, 10.4% Hispanic, and 9.6% redacted. The four-year graduation rate within the first 4 years of enrolling in high school was 88.89%. Graduation rates were broken down to: 89.74% Male, 88.24% Female, 100% Hispanic, 66.7% Low SES, 100% Native American, 100% Special Education, and 84.62% White. In 2018, reports indicate 29 students were enrolled in at least one advanced placement course, 20 students with chronic absenteeism, 10 indents of violence and 0 students reported as harassed or bullied based on sex, race, color, national origin or disability.

Academics
In the fiscal year 2018, the Arizona Department of Education published an annual achievement profile for Mogollon High School resulting in a grade of "B" based on an A through F scale. Scores were based on "year to year student academic growth, proficiency on English language arts, math and science, the proficiency and academic growth of English language learners, indicators that an elementary student is ready for success in high school and that high school students are ready to succeed in a career or higher education and high school graduation rates".

The United States national nonprofit organization, GreatSchools, gives Mogollon High School a 6/10 (about average) overall rating noting that students perform "about average on state tests, have far above average college readiness measures, and this school has below average results in how well it’s serving disadvantaged students". The organization gives Mogollon High School a 7/10 for "college readiness", 6/10 for standardized "test scores", 3/10 for "equity" (disadvantaged students at this school may be falling behind), and 3/10 for "low-income students" (test scores for low income students fall below the state average).

Extracurricular activities

Athletics

Mogollon High School competes in interscholastic athletics in several sports. The school is 1 of 9 high schools in the Arizona 1A Central Athletics Conference and competes in Division Division IV sports.

State championships for the Mustangs in athletics include the following:

Baseball (Boys): 1992, 2006 and 2019
Basketball (Girls): 2019
Football (Boys): 1994, 2003, 2008, 2014 and 2020
Softball (Girls): 1996, 2004 and 2006
Track and Field (Girls): 1999
Volleyball (Girls): 2018
Wrestling (Boys): 1995 and 2011

Clubs and Activities

National Honor Society
Robotics
Ski Club
Spanish Club

References

Public high schools in Arizona
Educational institutions established in 1989
Schools in Navajo County, Arizona
1989 establishments in Arizona